The 1996 Missouri Valley Conference men's basketball tournament was played after the conclusion of the 1995–1996 regular season at the Kiel Center in St. Louis, Missouri.

The  defeated the Bradley Braves in the championship game, 60–46, and as a result won their 4th MVC Tournament title and earned an automatic bid to the 1996 NCAA tournament. Shea Seals of Tulsa was named the tournament MVP.

Bracket

References

1995–96 Missouri Valley Conference men's basketball season
Missouri Valley Conference men's basketball tournament
Missouri Valley Conference men's basketball tournament
College basketball tournaments in Missouri
Basketball competitions in St. Louis